The  doubles Tournament at the 2006 Gaz de France Stars took place between October 30 and November 5 on indoor hard courts in Hasselt, Belgium.

Émilie Loit and Katarina Srebotnik were the defending champions, but both chose not to compete in 2006.

Lisa Raymond and Samantha Stosur won the title.

Seeds

Draw

Results

References

2006 Doubles
Gaz de France Stars - Doubles
2006 in Belgian tennis